Led by new manager Bill Rigney, the 1970 Minnesota Twins won the American League West with a 98–64 record, nine games ahead of the Oakland Athletics. The Twins were swept by the Baltimore Orioles in the American League Championship Series. Of note, the Twins were the only team in the American League to have a winning record in the regular season versus the Orioles. The 1970 ALCS would be the last MLB postseason games played at Metropolitan Stadium, as the Twins would not return to the postseason stage until 1987 when they won the World Series.

Offseason 
 October 13, 1969: Johnny Roseboro was released by the Twins.
 December 1, 1969: 1969 rule 5 draft
Mike Sadek was drafted from the Twins by the San Francisco Giants.
Hal Haydel was drafted by the Twins from the San Francisco Giants.
 December 10, 1969: Graig Nettles, Dean Chance, Bob Miller, and Ted Uhlaender were traded by the Twins to the Cleveland Indians for Luis Tiant and Stan Williams.
 March 21, 1970: Joe Grzenda and Charley Walters were traded by the Twins to the Washington Senators for Brant Alyea.

Regular season 
On April 7, newly acquired Twin Brant Alyea homered twice in going 4 for 4 and driving in 7 RBIs.  The RBI total set a record for major league baseball's Opening Day.

On May 20, in a 10–5 win over the Kansas City Royals, Rod Carew became the first Twin to hit for the cycle—going single, homer, double, triple.  Over time, his feat will be matched by nine other Twins (César Tovar, 1972; Larry Hisle, 1976; Lyman Bostock, 1976; Mike Cubbage, 1978; Gary Ward, 1980; Kirby Puckett, 1986; Carlos Gómez, 2008; Jason Kubel, 2009; and Michael Cuddyer, 2009).

On June 5, pitcher Bert Blyleven debuted, allowing a home run off the first batter he faced.

Four Twins made the All-Star Game: first baseman Harmon Killebrew, second baseman Rod Carew, outfielder Tony Oliva, and pitcher Jim Perry.

On September 16, Blyleven struck out the first six batters he faced to tie a major league record.  However, the Twins lost the game to the California Angels, 5–1.

The Twins are no-hit for the second time in their history, losing 6–0 to Oakland's Vida Blue.

The Twins won the American League West, led by leadoff batter César Tovar (120 runs), Oliva (.325, 23 HR, 107 RBI) and Killebrew (41 HR, 113 RBI).  Carew was batting .366 (after 51 games) when his knee was injured turning a double play. Perry won 24 games and became the first Twins pitcher to win the AL Cy Young Award. Jim Kaat added 14 wins and rookie Bert Blyleven won 10. Kaat also won his 9th Gold Glove Award.  Reliever Ron Perranoski led the AL with 34 saves.

1,261,887 fans attended Twins games, the third highest total in the American League.

Season standings

Record vs. opponents

Notable transactions 
 June 27, 1970: Craig Kusick was signed as an amateur free agent by the Twins.

Roster

Player stats

Batting

Starters by position 
Note: Pos = Position; G = Games played; AB = At bats; H = Hits; Avg. = Batting average; HR = Home runs; RBI = Runs batted in

Other batters 
Note: G = Games played; AB = At bats; H = Hits; Avg. = Batting average; HR = Home runs; RBI = Runs batted in

Pitching

Starting pitchers 
Note: G = Games pitched; IP = Innings pitched; W = Wins; L = Losses; ERA = Earned run average; SO = Strikeouts

Other pitchers 
Note: G = Games pitched; IP = Innings pitched; W = Wins; L = Losses; ERA = Earned run average; SO = Strikeouts

Relief pitchers 
Note: G = Games pitched; W = Wins; L = Losses; SV = Saves; ERA = Earned run average; SO = Strikeouts

Postseason

ALCS

Awards and honors 
 Jim Perry, American League Cy Young Award

Farm system 

LEAGUE CHAMPIONS: Auburn

Notes

References 

Player stats from www.baseball-reference.com
Team info from www.baseball-almanac.com

Minnesota Twins seasons
Minnesota Twins season
American League West champion seasons
Minnesota Twins